The Women's road race took place at 10 October 2010 at the Indira Gandhi Arena. The race started at 9:00 and covered 112 km.

Final classification
The notation "s.t." indicates that the rider crossed the finish line in the same group as the one receiving the time above him, and was therefore credited with the same finishing time.

External links
 Women's Road Race cyclingnews.com

Cycling at the 2010 Commonwealth Games
2010 in women's road cycling
Road cycling at the Commonwealth Games
2010 in Indian women's sport